Pyongyang Heliport Facility(평양헬기장) (ICAO:ZKKK) is a large heliport located next to the Taedong River in Pyongyang, North Korea.

Early years
This site was much smaller the current site and although it is not known exactly when the original heliport was constructed, it had been on the site since at least the year 2000.

Current heliport

Construction

Design

References

Transport in Pyongyang
Airports in North Korea
Heliports